WWE Fatal 4-Way was a professional wrestling pay-per-view (PPV) event produced by World Wrestling Entertainment (WWE). It was held for wrestlers from the promotion's Raw and SmackDown brand divisions. The event took place on June 20, 2010, at the Nassau Coliseum in Uniondale, New York. The show was based around a few matches on the card being contested as fatal four-way matches. Fatal 4-Way replaced The Bash as the June 2010 PPV.

The event received 143,000 pay-per-view buys, down on The Bash's figure of 178,000 buys. This was the final WWE pay-per-view event to be held in Nassau Coliseum before its 2015 renovation. This was the only Fatal 4-Way PPV produced by WWE for their main roster, as it was replaced by Capitol Punishment in 2011; however, the promotion revived the name for their developmental territory NXT in 2014 as the brand's second TakeOver event titled NXT TakeOver: Fatal 4-Way.

Production

Background
World Wrestling Entertainment (WWE) previously ran an annual summer pay-per-view (PPV) titled The Great American Bash from 2004 to 2009, which they had acquired in 2001 when the promotion purchased World Championship Wrestling. The 2009 event was titled The Bash. In 2010, WWE discontinued The Bash and replaced it with Fatal 4-Way. The event took place on June 20, 2010, at the Nassau Coliseum in Uniondale, New York and featured wrestlers from the Raw and SmackDown brands.

Storylines
Fatal 4-Way featured professional wrestling matches involving different wrestlers from pre-existing scripted feuds, plots, and storylines that played out on World Wrestling Entertainment's (WWE) television programs. Wrestlers portrayed a villain or a hero as they followed a series of events that build tension, and culminated into a wrestling match or series of matches.

The main feud for the Raw brand was a fatal four-way match for the WWE Championship between defending champion John Cena, Randy Orton, Edge and Sheamus. After Cena retained his title against Batista in an "I Quit" match at Over the Limit, Sheamus attacked Cena. On the May 24 episode of Raw, Bret Hart was announced as the new Raw General Manager. Before Batista could cut a promo, Hart interrupted and said that if Batista wanted his rematch, then he would have to qualify. Batista refused to wrestle, citing an injury and Hart then let Orton qualify by forfeit, causing Batista to quit the WWE afterwards. Edge and Sheamus won their respective qualifying matches to gain entry into the match alongside Orton. The following two weeks saw the four wrestlers compete against each other in singles and tag team bouts.

The main event for the SmackDown brand was a fatal four-way match for the World Heavyweight Championship between Jack Swagger, Big Show, CM Punk and Rey Mysterio. At Over the Limit, Big Show defeated Swagger by disqualification but did not win the championship since it cannot change hands on a disqualification, and as a result qualified for the fatal four-way match. The Undertaker and CM Punk won their respective qualifying matches against Rey Mysterio and Kane. Later Kane found his half-brother Undertaker in a storyline vegetative state, unable to compete and The Undertaker was removed from the match. A battle royal was put in place to determine The Undertaker's replacement in the match, which was won by Rey Mysterio who last eliminated Kane.

On the April 12 episode of Raw, Eve Torres beat Maryse for the Divas Championship. When Maryse attempted to seek revenge at Over the Limit, she was defeated by Eve. On the May 17 episode of Raw, Gail Kim teamed up with Evan Bourne to defeat Alicia Fox and Zack Ryder. After this, Kim and Fox started to feud for several weeks. On the June 14 episode of Raw, the current Divas Champion, Eve, teamed up with Kim in a winning effort against Maryse and Fox and a fatal four-way match was announced between the four.

Event

Preliminary matches

The event began with Kofi Kingston defending the Intercontinental Championship against Drew McIntyre. SmackDown General Manager Theodore Long was also in attendance near the announce table. The contest was even between both competitors. Kingston executed an S.O.S. on McIntyre for a near-fall. Kingston then applied a submission near the turnbuckle, but it was countered by McIntyre, who threw Kingston's legs into referee Charles Robinson, knocking him out. Since the referee was unable to officiate the match, McIntyre forced Long to fill in for the referee. When McIntyre attempted the pin, however, Long refused to count to three. As they argued, Matt Hardy interfered and attacked McIntyre, which allowed Kingston to perform Trouble in Paradise on McIntyre. Kingston then pinned McIntyre for the win and retained the title.

The WWE Divas Championship was defended next by Eve against Alicia Fox, Maryse, and Gail Kim in a fatal four-way match. Eve performed a moonsault on Maryse, but her pin attempt was broken up by Fox, who threw Eve out of the ring. She then covered Maryse and won her first title in the WWE.

Chris Jericho cut a promo, challenging Evan Bourne to an impromptu match. Jericho executed a Codebreaker on Bourne for a near-fall. The match ended when Bourne executed an Air Bourne on Jericho's back and pinned him for the win.

Main event matches

In the first main event match, Jack Swagger, Rey Mysterio, Big Show, and CM Punk competed in a fatal four-way match for the World Heavyweight Championship. Big Show dominated the first half of the match, quickly knocking down his opponents. The advantage turned when the other three concentrated their offense mainly on him taking him out for some time. The match was then contested evenly until Punk delivered a GTS to Swagger, but before he could pin him, Kane interrupted them, attempting to put Punk in a casket but Punk escaped with Kane in pursuit. Mysterio took advantage of the situation and delivered the 619 to Swagger and covered him to win the World Heavyweight Title.

In the next match, The Miz faced R-Truth for the United States Championship. The match went at a quick pace throughout and ended when Miz reversed R-Truth for a pin attempt to retain the title.

In the next match, Unified WWE Tag Team Champions The Hart Dynasty (Tyson Kidd, David Hart Smith and Natalya), faced The Usos and Tamina Snuka. The Hart Dynasty won after Natalya pinned Tamina after a Nattie-By-Nature.

In the main event, John Cena faced Sheamus, Randy Orton, and Edge in a fatal four-way match for the WWE Championship. None of the competitors stayed in the ring for long as when one would get an advantage over another opponent they would be interrupted by another one of the challengers. The match came to an abrupt end when the rookies from the first season of NXT who had previously formed a faction against the roster of the Raw brand, interrupted. The rookies first attacked Cena in the ring. Edge then tried to help him but was Nexus's next victim instead. In the midst of the commotion, Sheamus pinned Cena to win the title, bringing the event to a premature conclusion.

Reception
Approximately 10,000 people attended Fatal 4-Way live at the Nassau Veterans Memorial Coliseum in Uniondale, New York.

The event received generally mixed reviews. Bob Kapur from Canadian Online Explorer's wrestling section awarded the WWE Championship match an eight out of ten and the World Heavyweight Championship match a seven out of ten. He also appreciated Chris Jericho and Evan Bourne for their performances in their match and rated the match as eight out of ten. Overall, he awarded the event a score of eight out of ten.

Aftermath
This would be the only Fatal 4-Way PPV produced by WWE for their main roster as it was replaced by Capitol Punishment in 2011. In April 2011, WWE ceased using its full name with the "WWE" abbreviation becoming an orphaned initialism. WWE revived the event's name in 2014 for their developmental territory NXT as a TakeOver event titled NXT TakeOver: Fatal 4-Way.

Results

References

External links
Official WWE Fatal 4-Way website

2010 in New York (state)
Fatal 4-Way
2010 WWE pay-per-view events
June 2010 events in the United States
Professional wrestling in Uniondale, New York
Events on Long Island
Events in Uniondale, New York